= James Hardie House =

Commercial building in Sydney, Australia

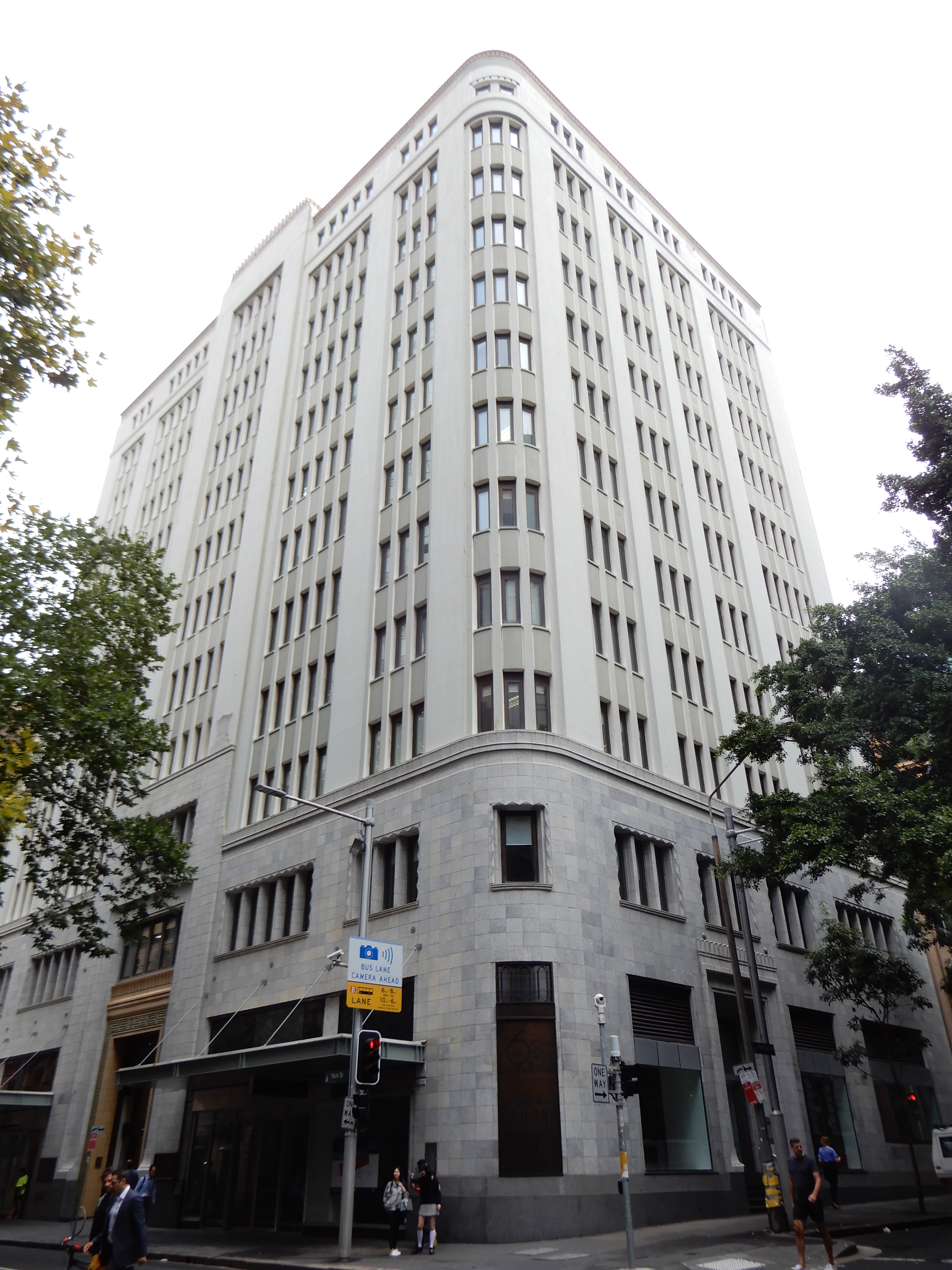
- Interactive map of the James Hardie House area
- Alternative names: Asbestos House

General information
- Type: Commercial
- Location: Sydney, Australia
- Coordinates: 33.867908°S 151.205726°E

The James Hardie House (also known as the Asbestos House) is an Art Deco commercial building in Sydney, Australia.

== History ==
The building, designed by Robertson and Marks in association with John Reid and Sons in 1927, was built in two phases. The first section of the building was completed in 1928-29 and the second in 1934–35.

The James Hardie company occupied the building until March 2002.

== Description ==
Located at 65-69 York Street in the Sydney CBD, the building features an Art Deco style.

== Gallery ==
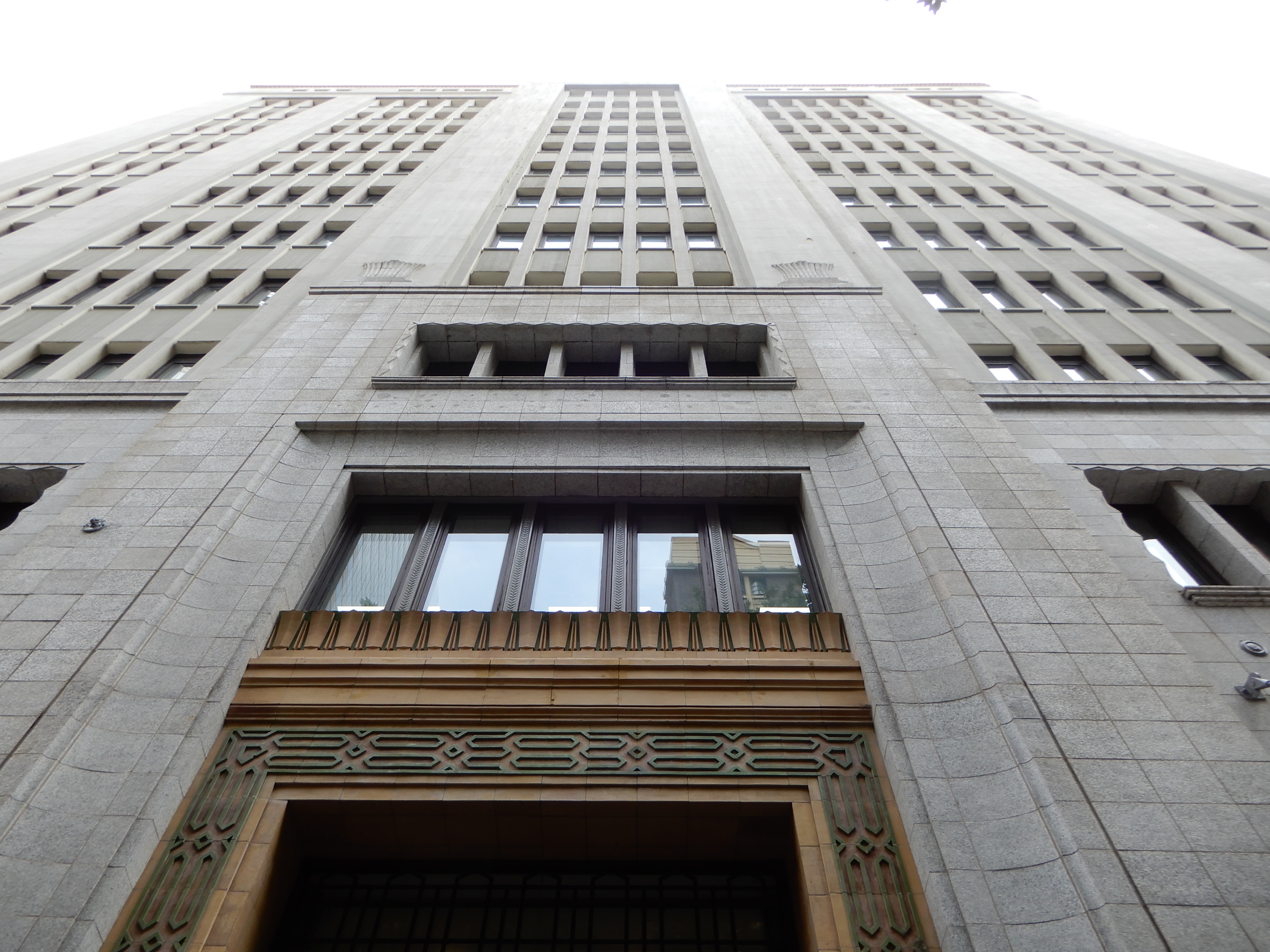

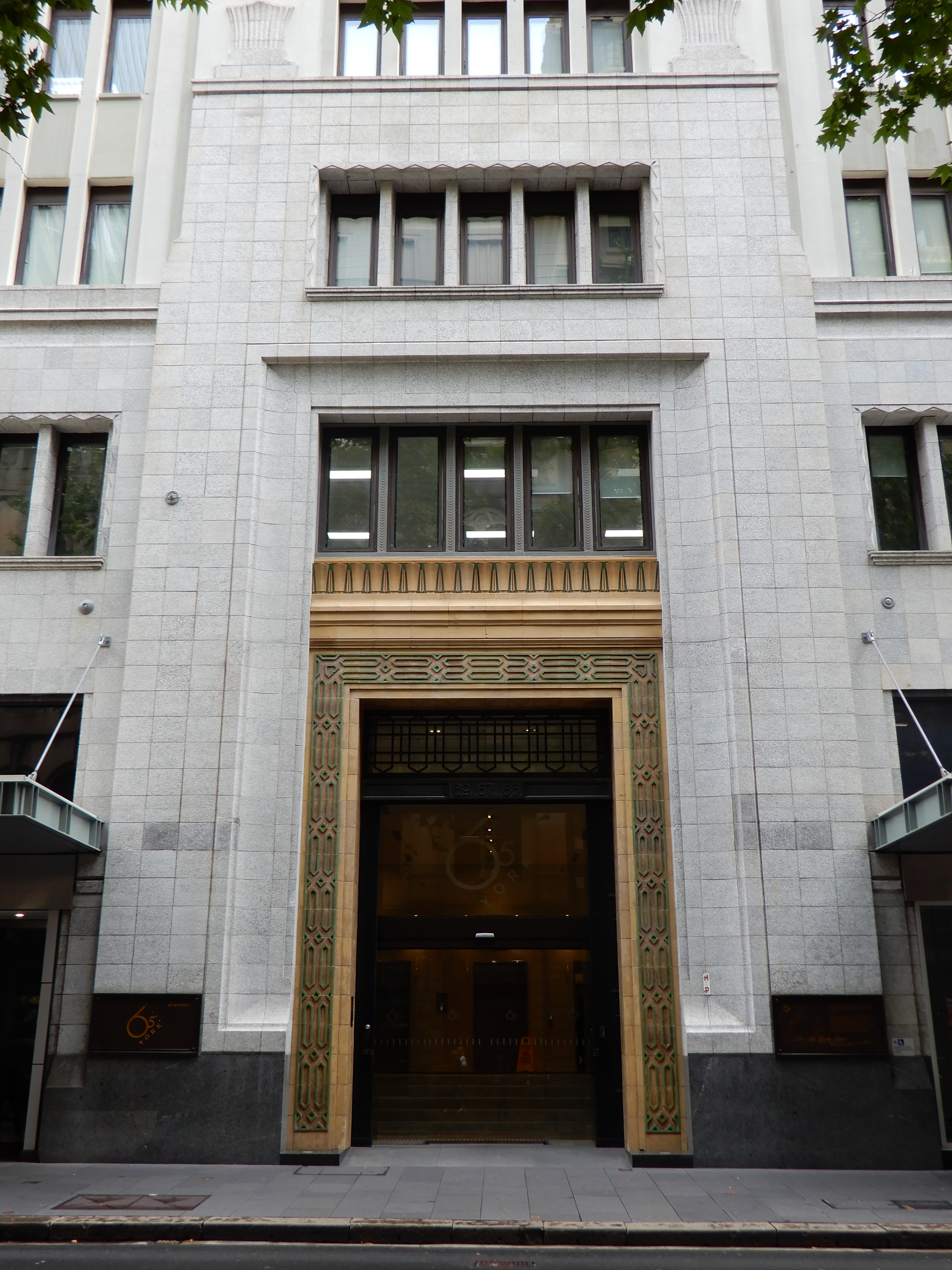

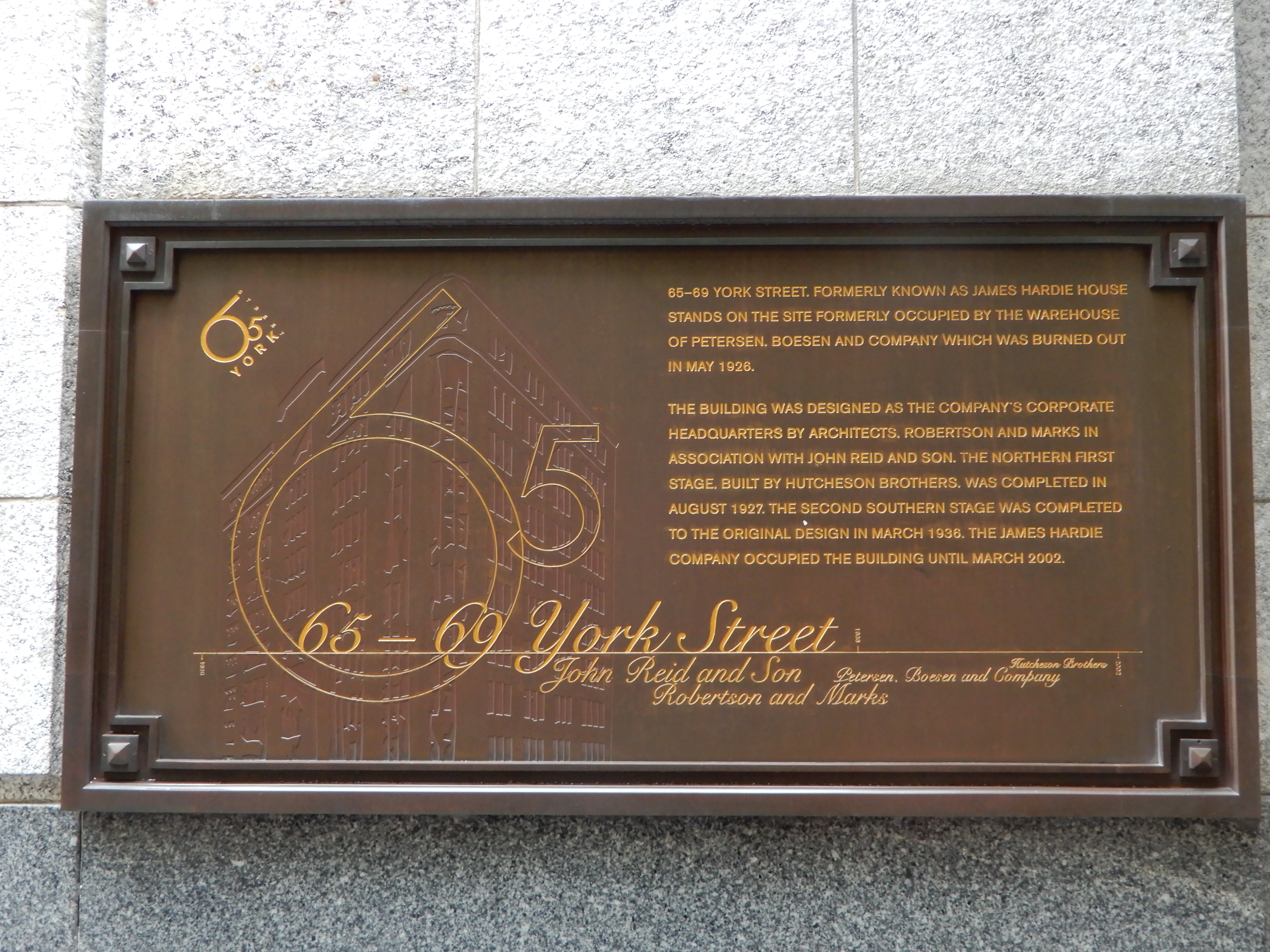
